Roderick Genki Dean (born 30 December 1991) is a Japanese athlete who competes in the  javelin throw. He was born to a Japanese mother and a British father from Chester-le-Street, England.

He started throwing the javelin at age 15 in high school and immediately displayed an aptitude for the discipline. He won a silver medal at the  2010 World Junior Championships in Athletics throwing a new personal best of  76.44 m.  He first came to prominence at the 2012 Japan Championships in Athletics, throwing 84.03 m, setting a new championship record, beating veteran Yukifumi Murakami and sealing his place in the Japanese team for the 2012 Summer Olympics in the Javelin throw.  He was selected as the Most Valuable Male Athlete of the Japanese Championships. At the 2012 Olympics he threw 82.07m to qualify from the heats, but could not improve on this and finished 10th in the final with 79.95m.

Dean won Japan's National Javelin Championship and earned a gold medal in June 2022 with a 81.02m throw.

Seasonal bests by year
2009 - 70.57
2010 - 78.57
2011 - 79.20
2012 - 84.28
2013 - 80.15
2014 - 77.32
2015 - 75.09

References

External links

1991 births
Living people
Japanese male javelin throwers
Olympic male javelin throwers
Olympic athletes of Japan
Athletes (track and field) at the 2012 Summer Olympics
Japan Championships in Athletics winners
Japanese people of English descent